East Taunton Fire Station is a historic fire station located on Middleboro Avenue in the East Taunton section of Taunton, Massachusetts. It was built in 1899 to replace a rented facility that housed the Old Colony Engine Company.  It is a two-story brick building, five bays wide, with a hip roof.  The rightmost three bays project forward, with a cross-gable hip roof, with the rightmost bays housing engines, and the left bay of the projection providing the main pedestrian entry.  The building was added to the National Register of Historic Places in 1984.

It is occupied by the Taunton Fire Department's Engine 9, Forestry 1, and the Taunton Police "East Taunton Precinct".

See also
National Register of Historic Places listings in Taunton, Massachusetts
Taunton Fire Department

References

National Register of Historic Places in Bristol County, Massachusetts
Fire stations completed in 1899
Fire stations on the National Register of Historic Places in Massachusetts
Buildings and structures in Taunton, Massachusetts
1899 establishments in Massachusetts